Goran Perak (born 1 June 1986 in Osijek) is a Croatia footballer who plays as a midfielder.

Career
Perak left Bosnian top tier side Željezničar in June 2011.
He moved to Sime Darby F.C. in the Malaysia Premier League at the end of 2012.

References

External links
 
Profil Goran (malay)

1986 births
Living people
Sportspeople from Osijek
Association football midfielders
Croatian footballers
NK Osijek players
NK Grafičar Vodovod players
NK Belišće players
NK Hrvatski Dragovoljac players
NK Imotski players
Kecskeméti TE players
FK Željezničar Sarajevo players
NK Vinogradar players
Sime Darby F.C. players
Croatian Football League players
Nemzeti Bajnokság I players
Premier League of Bosnia and Herzegovina players
First Football League (Croatia) players
Croatian expatriate footballers
Expatriate footballers in Hungary
Croatian expatriate sportspeople in Hungary
Expatriate footballers in Bosnia and Herzegovina
Croatian expatriate sportspeople in Bosnia and Herzegovina
Expatriate footballers in Malaysia
Croatian expatriate sportspeople in Malaysia